John "Johnny" Bullock was a professional rugby league footballer who played in the 1950s.

Notable tour matches
Johnny Bullock played  in Wakefield Trinity's 17–12 victory over Australia in the 1956–57 Kangaroo tour of Great Britain and France match at Belle Vue, Wakefield on Monday 10 December 1956.

References

External links
Search for "Bullock" at rugbyleagueproject.org

Johnny Bullock & Harry Burton pass away

2009 deaths
English rugby league players
Place of birth missing
Place of death missing
Rugby league halfbacks
Wakefield Trinity players
Year of birth missing